Matucana is a town in Central Peru, capital of the Matucana District located in the Huarochirí Province, in the Department of Lima. It's located to the east of Lima at 2,378 m (7,802 ft) above sea level, along the Central Highway at km 74.

History

Matucana was founded in 1647 by Miguel de Castro y García, a descendant of one of Francisco Pizarro's Conquistadores. He discovered gold in the hills outside of Matucana at a site that was once a holy shrine for the Incas. Using Inca slaves to operate the mine, he became very wealthy and eventually returned to live in Lima, Peru. The gold mine was unfortunately buried in a huge avalanche triggered by the devastating Santa Ursula earthquake of October 21, 1756, which also caused great damage to the City of Lima.

Society and culture

The City of Matucana is a popular destination for eco-tourists, as it has beautiful water falls in the deep valleys outside of the town and plentiful hiking trails.  It is also the starting point for the increasingly popular "De Las Montanas y Mar" bicycle race held every year between Matucana and Lima.

The bicycle race starts at the Chez Victor Restaurant in Matucana and finishes at the La Rosa Nautica Restaurant in Lima. One of Don Miguel's descendants runs the Chez Victor restaurant in Matucana, while the La Rosa Nautica Restaurant is owned by the descendants of the Viceroy who granted the lands around Matucana to Don Miguel de Castro y Garcia.  Coincidentally, the Chez Victor Restaurant was started with a grant received from Hernando De Soto's Institute for Liberty and Democracy.

References
 Instituto Nacional de Estadística e Informática Resultados censales 

Populated places in the Lima Region
1647 establishments in the Spanish Empire
Populated places established in 1647